Moonrise (original title, in Polish: Wschód księżyca) is the title of nocturne, landscape painting by the Polish artist Stanisław Masłowski (1853-1926). It is an Oil painting on canvas, dimensions: 124 x 220 cm, signed: "SMasłowski/Wars. 84.".

Description 
The painting shows a late evening,  nocturne view of the vast panorama of the sky and the water. The water view is separated by a streak of sandy levee/dike and a number of trees - almost naked, leafless trunks. On the sky's background, gray horizontal cloud streaks are visible. Just above the horizon the golden-yellow shield of the moon, partially covered with a gray, cloudy stripe, is painted. It's reflection over the surface of the water is visible in the shape of a golden vertical streak running from a distant horizon, towards the viewer.

In the present painting Masłowski has solved the problem of dim light, the problem of its subtle gradation. The water, the sky, and the trees are the object of careful painter's attention.

Supplementary data 
The present painting Masłowski has accomplished in early stage of  his biography, when he was just about thirty (1884).

It was important in the artist's creative development in 1884–1887, when Masłowski [...] has entered a new phase of creativity and went into a new environment of art and has established close relations with a group of painters and writers associated with 'Wędrowiec' magazine (A. Gierymski, A. Sygietyński, and young: J. Pankiewicz and W. Podkowiński).

The special place of the "Moonrise" painting in the development of Masłowski's work has been emphasized by Tadeusz Dobrowolski (art historian, professor of the Jagiellonian University) in the following sentences (transl.): [...] "About 1880, the artist’s relationship with nature and a living model began to strengthen. However it was still understood in traditional (non-impressionist) terms. [...] The element of air and water, bare trees on the dike, which cuts into two parts a vast sheet of ponds, and the evening, the cloudy sky, and a mirrored moonlight on the water, bring a complete illusion of reality".

The image is not typical for Maslowski's art, since the watercolour was his favourite technique of painting, particularly in later years.

The painting has been initially exhibited and reproduced under the different names - for instance: "Evening" (the exhibitions at The Society for the Encouragement of Fine Arts in Warsaw, 1884, and at The Kraków Society of Friends of Fine Arts, 1886); "Moonrise" (at the first Great Exhibition of Polish Art in Kraków, 1887); "Landscape at the moonlight" (at the Exhibition of Polish Art in Lviv, 1894, where it was praised), and in 1924 - as "Grobla Boruszkowiecka" ('Boruszkowce Dike')  

In 1900 it has been purchased for the collection of the National Museum in Krakow and then reproduced, among others in "Tygodnik Illustrowany", 1902, part I, p. 405; and in another Polish weekly "Świat" ("World"), Warsaw, 1907, no. 29, p. 5, as well as on the separate card, issued by The National Museum in Krakow.

According to the Painter's son (art historian) (1957) - however the present painting has been created in realistic style - it had been inspired by Polish romantic poetry - by Słowacki's Beniowski poem.

Though the demonstrated here painting has been created in Poland, it has inspired the American  lyric poet Sara Teasdale (1884-1933), who has written the following poem:

References

Sources 
 (in Polish) Polish Biographical Dictionary, Wrocław - Warszawa - Kraków - Gdańsk, 1975, ed. "Ossolineum" Publishers, vol. XX/1;
 (in Polish) Stanisław Masłowski – Materiały do życiorysu i twórczości ('Materials for biography and creativity'), ed. by Maciej Masłowski, Wrocław 1957, "Ossolineum" Publishers;
 (in Polish) Wacława Milewska, National Museum in Krakow - http://imnk.pl/gallerybox.php?dir=SU442 (Acc.: 9 Feb. 2023);
 (In Polish) Halina Cękalska-Zborowska: "Wieś w malarstwie i rysunku naszych artystów" (The Countryside in our artist's painting and drawing), Warszawa 1969, ed. Ludowa Spółdzielnia Wydawnicza Publishers;
 (In Polish) Tadeusz Dobrowolski: Nowoczesne malarstwo polskie (Modern Painting), vol. III, Wrocław - Kraków, 1960, "Ossolineum" Publishers.
 http://poems.theotherpages.org/books/teasdale/flame02.html#50 (acc.: 9 Feb. 2023)

1884 paintings
Landscape paintings
Oil paintings